Richard Bernard Daniels (born October 19, 1944) is a former American football defensive back in the National Football League for the Dallas Cowboys and Chicago Bears. He played college football at Pacific University.

Early years
Daniels attended Jefferson High School, where he was an honorable-mention All-PIL halfback and a part of two football championship teams. He also contributed to his school winning a track championship team.

He accepted a football scholarship from Pacific University, where he practiced football and track. He was a two-time conference champion in the long jump.

In 1995, he was inducted into the Pacific University Athletic Hall of Fame.

Dallas Cowboys
Daniels was signed as an undrafted free agent by the Dallas Cowboys after the 1966 NFL Draft. On September 29, he was placed on the taxi squad, before being activated to play in 4 games. He was a part of the 1967 NFL Championship Game known as the "Ice Bowl".

In 1968, he was out for 4 weeks after being injured in pre-season, but came back to move Mel Renfro to right cornerback and start 6 games at free safety. He was waived on September 18, 1969.

Chicago Bears
In 1969, he was signed to the Chicago Bears taxi squad, before being promoted to the active roster on November 1. The next year, he started 13 games at free safety. On August 26, 1971, he was released after being passed on the depth chart by Jerry Moore.

Miami Dolphins
August 26, 1971, he was claimed off waivers by the Miami Dolphins. He was placed on the injured reserve list on September 13.

Personal life
In 1972, he was hired as a scout by the Miami Dolphins. In 1975, he was hired as the Tampa Bay Buccaneers Chief Talent Scout. In 1984, he was vice president for personnel for the Los Angeles Express. He was the director of player personnel for the Washington Redskins. In 1996, he was named director of football operations for the Philadelphia Eagles. He was a consultant with Football Operations and NFL Ventures.

References

1944 births
Living people
Sportspeople from Portland, Oregon
Players of American football from Portland, Oregon
American football defensive backs
Pacific Boxers football players
Dallas Cowboys players
Chicago Bears players
Miami Dolphins players
Miami Dolphins scouts
Tampa Bay Buccaneers executives
Tampa Bay Buccaneers scouts
Philadelphia Eagles executives
San Diego Chargers executives
San Francisco 49ers scouts
Washington Redskins executives